Kurt Thomas Abbott (born June 2, 1969) is an American former professional baseball player who played primarily as a shortstop and second baseman from  to .

Career
Abbott was born in Zanesville, Ohio and graduated from Dixie M. Hollins High School in St. Petersburg, Florida. He played collegiately at St. Petersburg Junior College. Abbott was drafted by the Oakland Athletics in the 15th round of the 1989 Major League Baseball Draft.  He was the last player selected in that round and the only position player from that round to make it to the major leagues.

Abbott would break into the major leagues on September 7, 1993, as a member of the Athletics in an 11-7 win over the Blue Jays.  Abbott was called upon in the top of the 10th inning to run for Dave Henderson after Henderson singled off Mike Timlin. He was retired when Rubén Sierra grounded into a double play and was replaced in the field by Scott Lydy in the bottom of the 10th inning. Abbott would see action in 24 games for the Athletics that fall, and was traded to the Florida Marlins after the season in exchange for Kerwin Moore.

It was with the Marlins that Abbott spent the majority of his career, staying with them until 1998, primarily as a shortstop. He drove in six runs in an 11-2 victory over the Astros on July 17, 1996, missing the cycle by only a double. He was a member of the 1997 team that won the World Series, appearing in three games as a pinch hitter but failing to get a hit.  He would be traded back to the Athletics after the season for Eric Ludwick. He did not stay long in his second tour of duty, appearing in only 35 games before being traded to the Colorado Rockies on June 9 for a player to be named later. Abbott proved a valuable utilityman, playing all infield and outfield positions in his time with the team. He became a free agent after the 1999 season and signed a one-year contract with the New York Mets for the 2000 season.

Abbott appeared in 79 games for the Mets in 2000, primarily as a shortstop but also seeing time at second base. He was ejected for the only time in his career on June 9, arguing a play at first base in the top of the 2nd inning.  He was granted free agency after the season and signed a one-year contract with the Atlanta Braves.

Abbott would only appear in 6 games for the Braves in 2001, playing the final game of his career on April 13, a win over the Phillies.  Pinch-hitting for Mike Remlinger, he reached base on an error and stole second base, but was thrown out trying to score by the Phillies' Doug Glanville to end the inning. Abbott was granted free agency after the season, and lingered in the minor leagues until 2003, playing his final 21 games for the Memphis Redbirds.

Personal life
Abbott is married to Candice Abbott.  Together they have four children, Matthew, Kyra, Kyle and Isabella.  Abbott and his wife reside in Stuart, FL.  Abbott retired as a Sheriff's Deputy in 2012 and is currently employed with Masco Coatings, Inc.

References

External links

1969 births
Living people
American expatriate baseball players in Canada
Arizona League Athletics players
Atlanta Braves players
Baseball players from Ohio
Charlotte Knights players
Colorado Rockies players
Columbus Clippers players
Edmonton Trappers players
Florida Marlins players
Greenville Braves players
Huntsville Stars players
Madison Muskies players
Major League Baseball infielders
Memphis Redbirds players
Modesto A's players
New York Mets players
Norfolk Tides players
Oakland Athletics players
Richmond Braves players
Southern Oregon A's players
Sportspeople from Zanesville, Ohio
St. Petersburg Titans baseball players
Tacoma Tigers players
Dixie Hollins High School alumni